Thorsten Kinhöfer (born 27 June 1968) is a former German football referee in the Fußball-Bundesliga.

Refereeing career
Kinhöfer is appointed to matches under the auspices of the German FA since 1994. He was added to the list of 2nd Bundesliga referees in 1997 and promoted to Bundesliga status in 2002. In 2010, he officiated the Final of the DFB-Pokal.

Kinhöfer is on the FIFA eligible list since January 2006. He was also appointed to matches of the South Korean K-League in 2003, the Qatar Stars League in 2006, 2007, 2008 and 2010 and the Saudi Professional League in 2008 as a guest referee.

Kinhöfer retired from officiating in 2015 because he reached the age limit for German referees, which is 47.

Personal life
Kinhöfer lives in Herne and works as a Comptroller at the Municipal Utility District of the city.

References

External links
 Profile at worldfootball.net

1968 births
Living people
German football referees
UEFA Europa League referees